Jan Kosi (born October 18, 1996) is a Slovenian professional basketball player for Cedevita Olimpija of the Slovenian League. He is a 2.04 m tall Power forward.

Professional career
Kosi started playing professional basketball for Elektra Šoštanj.

In September 2016, Kosi signed with Sixt Primorska.

On June 16, 2022, he has signed with Cedevita Olimpija of the Slovenian League.

References

External links
 Eurobasket.com profile
 KZS profile
 REALGM profile

1996 births
Living people
Centers (basketball)
KK Krka players
Power forwards (basketball)
Slovenian men's basketball players